Jurgen van den Goorbergh (born 29 December 1969) is a Dutch former professional motorcycle road racer also known as The Flying Dutchman. His son, Zonta van den Goorbergh,  is also a motorcycle racer and currently competes in Moto2.

Career
Born in Breda, Netherlands, Van den Goorbergh won the Dutch 250cc road racing national championship in 1991. He began his Grand Prix career in 1991 in the 250cc class. In 1997 he moved up to the 500cc class racing a privately sponsored Honda. MuZ hired him to race for them in the 1999 season. in this season he surprised by taking 2 pole positions. one at the circuit of Catalonia (Barcelona) and one in Brno. he raced with Mollenaar racing in 2000 and in 2001 raced with the team of Kenny Roberts-Proton team. The 2002 season did not start off well for van den Goorbergh, scoring only 21 points in first 10 races. At the end of season he made his best result in Australian Grand Prix, finished on 5th place only three hundredth of a second behind third Tohru Ukawa.

From 2003 to 2005, van den Goorbergh raced in the Supersport World Championship. He is considered an expert in wet racing. In the wet 2005 Chinese Grand Prix at Shanghai, van den Goorbergh substituted for the injured Makoto Tamada. He began from in 19th position and finished a respectable 6th place for the Konica Minolta Honda team.

In 2006 and 2007 van den Goorbergh did not join a road racing team, but tested MotoGP tyres for Michelin. He raced in the European Enduro Championships, the Dutch trial Championships and in Supermoto competitions. He competed in the Dakar Rally for the first time in 2009 - finishing 17th and best rookie that year. In 2010 Jurgen competed in Dakar again, this time with a buggy and did not finish. In 2010 Jurgen has competed in several events and is preparing himself for the 2011 Dakar - again with a buggy.

Motorcycle Grand Prix career results

Races by year

(key) (Races in bold indicate pole position)

References

External links

 Jurgen van den Goorbergh web site

1969 births
Living people
Sportspeople from Breda
Dutch motorcycle racers
250cc World Championship riders
500cc World Championship riders
MotoGP World Championship riders
Supersport World Championship riders
Superbike World Championship riders
Porsche Carrera Cup GB drivers
Dakar Rally drivers